Moffat is a major brand of home appliances and food preparation machinery originally started in New Zealand and Australia in the 1920s. They opened regional divisions around the world with local production in many countries including New Zealand, Australia, the United States and Canada. Among their many products, Moffat was a pioneer in the convection oven space.

They were owned by Litton Industries for a time in the 1970s, and today are largely a branding company who markets equipment produced by other companies. For instance, in North America their appliances are built by Camco, a partnership between General Electric and GSW Inc.

References
 
 
 https://thomaygiat.net/

Home appliances
Branding companies
Companies established in the 1920s